Milecastle 1 (Stott's Pow) was a milecastle of the Roman Hadrian's Wall.  It was located near the (now disappeared) valley of Stott's Pow.  Its remains are covered over, and are located beneath the recreation ground at Miller's Dene.
Early excavations and investigations of Turret 0B were mistakenly interpreted as Milecastle 1. The Milecastle sits within the parish of Wallsend.

Construction
Milecastle 1 was a short-axis milecastle of unknown gateway type.  Short-axis milecastles were thought to have been constructed by the legio II Augusta who were based in Isca Augusta (Caerleon).

Milecastle 1 Easting and Northing:

Easting: 360162

Northing: 563796

Milecastle 1 English Heritage number: 1003507.

Excavations and investigations

1732 - Horsley recorded the milecastle as short-axis and also its proximity to Stott's Pow.

1848 - Collingwood Bruce studied the wall and wrote: 

1852-4 - Henry MacLauchlan surveyed the milecastle's position and recorded it as a short-axis milecastle.

1928 - F G Simpson tested the site and found  only Roman occupation soil and debris remained, assuming that even the foundations had been robbed away. His measurements between the centres of Milecastle 1 and Milecastle 2 was ed .
1947 - The recreation ground which now covers the site of Milecastle 1 was leveled in 1947.  Part of the "Wall Ditch" and traces of the milecastle were still according to Grace Simpson. She also stated in her notes (circa 1978) that the fragment of Wall Ditch had now completely disappeared but the trace of the milecastle was still faintly discernible.
1975 - English Heritage Field Investigation.  It was noted that:
1978 - Grace Simpson (circa 1978) that the fragment of Wall Ditch had now completely disappeared but the "trace of the Milecastle ... is still faintly discernible".

Associated turrets
Each milecastle on Hadrian's Wall had two associated turret structures.  These turrets were positioned approximately one-third and two-thirds of a Roman mile to the west of the Milecastle, and would probably have been manned by part of the milecastle's garrison.  The turrets associated with Milecastle 1 are known as Turret 1A and Turret 1B.

Turret 1A

Turret 1B

Monument records

References

01